Angola on the Lake is a hamlet and census-designated place (CDP) in Erie County, New York, United States. The population was 1,675 at the 2010 census. It is part of the Buffalo–Niagara Falls Metropolitan Statistical Area.

Angola on the Lake is in the town of Evans and is west of the village of Angola. The hamlet is located on the eastern shore of Lake Erie.

Geography

Demographics

As of the census of 2000, there were 1,771 people, 757 households, and 480 families living in the village. The population density was 701.4 per square mile (271.3/km2). There were 943 housing units at an average density of 373.5/sq mi (144.5/km2). The racial makeup of the CDP was 98.76% White, 0.34% African American, 0.28% Native American, 0.06% from other races, and 0.56% from two or more races. Hispanic or Latino of any race were 0.85% of the population.

There were 757 households, out of which 23.9% had children under the age of 18 living with them, 49.7% were married couples living together, 10.0% had a female householder with no husband present, and 36.5% were non-families. 32.2% of all households were made up of individuals, and 12.7% had someone living alone who was 65 years of age or older. The average household size was 2.34 and the average family size was 2.95.

In the community, the population was spread out, with 20.9% under the age of 18, 6.6% from 18 to 24, 28.9% from 25 to 44, 27.4% from 45 to 64, and 16.2% who were 65 years of age or older. The median age was 41 years. For every 100 females, there were 91.7 males. For every 100 females age 18 and over, there were 89.6 males.

The median income for a household in the village was $28,641, and the median income for a family was $38,167. Males had a median income of $29,167 versus $22,750 for females. The per capita income for the CDP was $19,319. About 12.4% of families and 13.0% of the population were below the poverty line, including 19.3% of those under age 18 and 1.5% of those age 65 or over.

References

Census-designated places in New York (state)
Hamlets in New York (state)
Buffalo–Niagara Falls metropolitan area
Census-designated places in Erie County, New York
Hamlets in Erie County, New York